Gari is a village and seat of the commune of Tinguereguif in the Cercle of Diré in the Tombouctou Region of Mali.

References

Populated places in Tombouctou Region